Espolada Hokkaido (エスポラーダ北海道) is a Japanese professional futsal club, currently playing in the F. League Division 1. The team is located in Sapporo, Hokkaido.

Arena
Espolada Hokkaido plays its home games mainly at the Hokkai Kitayell, but, as the team represents the entire Hokkaido Prefecture, also plays some home-games at the Asahikawa Taisetsu Arena, Otaru City Gymnasium, Hakodate Arena, Tomakomai City Gymnasium, Mikaho Gymnasium and Kushiro Kaze Arena.

History

External links 

Futsal clubs in Japan
Sports teams in Sapporo
Futsal clubs established in 2008
2008 establishments in Japan